Elmer H. Den Herder (August 14, 1908 – June 2, 1978) was an American politician who served in the Iowa House of Representatives from 1957 to 1978.

He died of cancer on June 2, 1978, in Sioux Center, Iowa at age 69.

References

1908 births
1978 deaths
Republican Party members of the Iowa House of Representatives
20th-century American politicians